Jan J. Sneva (born August 17, 1953 in Spokane, Washington) is a former race car driver, and the brother of Jerry Sneva, as well as Indianapolis 500 winner Tom Sneva.

The youngest of the three brothers, Jan was primarily a midget car and sprint car racer, but he made 2 starts in the USAC Championship Car series (1 each in 1979 and 1981 at Milwaukee and Pocono respectively) and 1 start in the CART Champ Car series when he finished 10th in the April 1980 race at the Ontario Motor Speedway.  He also attempted to qualify for the Indianapolis 500 twice but failed rookie orientation in 1980 and failed to qualify in 1982.  He now resides in Mesa, Arizona.

References

External links
Jan Sneva at ChampCarStats.com

1953 births
Racing drivers from Washington (state)
Champ Car drivers
Living people
Sportspeople from Spokane, Washington